Aline was the first settlement of Latter-day Saints in what is today Teton County, Idaho. It was formed in 1888. However, by 1901 it was overshadowed as the main town by Driggs, Idaho and virtually ceased to exist.

References

Populated places in Teton County, Idaho
Ghost towns in Idaho
Populated places established in 1888